Licostinel (INN) (code name ACEA-1021) is a competitive, silent antagonist of the glycine site of the NMDA receptor (Kb = 5 nM). It was under investigation by Acea Pharmaceuticals as a neuroprotective agent for the treatment of cerebral ischemia associated with stroke and head injuries but was ultimately never marketed. In clinical trials, licostinel did not produce phencyclidine-like psychotomimetic effects at the doses tested, though transient sedation, dizziness, and nausea were observed. In addition to its actions at the NMDA receptor, licostinel also acts as an antagonist of the AMPA and kainate receptors at high concentrations (Kb = 0.9 μM and 2.5 μM, respectively).

See also
 Aptiganel
 Eliprodil
 Gavestinel
 Lubeluzole
 Selfotel

References

AMPA receptor antagonists
Kainate receptor antagonists
Nitro compounds
Neuroprotective agents
NMDA receptor antagonists
Chloroarenes
Quinoxalines